Nemapogon hungaricus is a moth of the family Tineidae. It is found in Italy, Croatia, Slovakia, Bulgaria, Romania, Hungary, North Macedonia, Greece, Ukraine, Russia, and on Sardinia.

References

Moths described in 1960
Nemapogoninae